This article lists forms of Transport in the Netherlands Antilles.

Rail
No railway tracks exist in the Netherlands Antilles

Roads
All driving is on the right.

Sea

Ports and harbours
Fort Bay (Saba), Kralendijk (Bonaire), Philipsburg (Saint Martin), Willemstad (Curaçao)

Merchant marine
total
110 ships (1,000 GT or over) totaling 1,028,910 GT/
ships by type
bulk 2, cargo 27, chemical tanker 2, combination ore/oil 3, container 16, liquified gas 4, multi-functional large load carrier 18, passenger 1, petroleum tanker 5, refrigerated cargo 26, roll-on/roll-off 6 (1999 est.)
note
a flag of convenience registry; includes ships of 2 countries: Belgium owns 9 ships, Germany 1 (1998 est.)

Air

Airports
5 (2005 est.)

Airports - with paved runways
total 5
over 3,047 m 1
2,438 to 3,047 m 1 
1,524 to 2,437 m 1
914 to 1,523 m 1
under 914 m 1 (2005 est.)

List of airports in the Netherlands Antilles

See also
Transport in Aruba